Simona Petrucci (born 17 April 1971) is an Italian politician who has served as a Senator since 13 October 2022.

References

1971 births
21st-century Italian women politicians
Politicians from Grosseto
Brothers of Italy politicians
Senators of Legislature XIX of Italy
Living people
20th-century Italian people
Women members of the Senate of the Republic (Italy)